Hitsville USA: The Motown Singles Collection 1959–1971 is a 1992 four-CD collection of Motown hits, during Motown's golden age when the songs were recorded at its original Detroit studio.  The selections on this compilation were transferred from the original single mixes, which were mixed for AM radio play and 45 RPM singles.  Therefore, the tracks are mono. It was followed a year later by the release of Hitsville USA: The Motown Singles Collection Volume 2 1972–1992.

Track listing

Charts

References

1992 compilation albums
Motown compilation albums
Soul compilation albums
Pop compilation albums
Rhythm and blues compilation albums
Record label compilation albums